The Elevation Science Institute (ESI), formerly known as the Bighorn Basin Paleontological Institute, is a non-profit 501(c)(3) organization dedicated to paleontology and earth science research, education, and outreach. The organization conducts paleontological field work in the Bighorn Basin of Montana and Wyoming, largely focusing on vertebrates from the Mesozoic. During the off-season, the ESI is primarily based in Philadelphia, Pennsylvania, where they work to provide free outreach and education programs in the natural sciences to the public. The ESI is the official scientific and educational partner of Field Station: Dinosaurs. The ESI also operates the Fossil Preparation Lab at the Academy of Natural Sciences of Drexel University, which serves as the ESI's base of operations for fossil preparation and research. The ESI also works very closely with the Academy to develop and implement educational programming. The Cincinnati Museum Center, Museum of Natural History and Science is the official repository for all fossils collected by the ESI.

Programs 
The ESI runs a six-week field expedition each summer in southern Montana and northern Wyoming to collect fossils of dinosaurs and other Mesozoic vertebrates. Field programs generally run from late June through mid-August. These field expeditions are open to sign-ups for individuals to learn about the geology, paleontology, and natural history of the region while aiding ESI paleontologists in collecting fossils for research. For students, the program is available as a for-credit field paleontology course through Rocky Mountain College.

From 2017 to 2019, the ESI also offered a dinosaur-themed summer camp program entitled Dinosaur Treasures in Our Backyard for children throughout rural Carbon County, Montana and in Cody, Wyoming. The program features several lessons and hands-on activities to teach children about dinosaurs, paleontology, and the fossil discoveries that have been made within their region.

Dig sites 
The ESI's dig sites are largely within the Lance and Morrison formations, though they have also spanned through the Cloverly, Fort Union, and Willwood formations. Nearly all of the ESI's localities lie within Carbon County, MT. Among the ESI's excavation sites is the Mother's Day Quarry which the team has been excavating since the summer of 2017.

The ESI has excavated a wide variety of dinosaur genera including Diplodocus, Tyrannosaurus, Allosaurus, Triceratops, Leptoceratops, Suuwassea, Edmontosaurus, Ankylosaur, and many others. Their finds have included many crocodilian, turtle, and plant fossils as well.

References

External links
 The Elevation Science Institute Website
Paleontology
Non-profit organizations based in Montana